Kobad Hussain Ahmed was an Indian politician. He was an elected Member of Assam Legislative Assembly from Mankachar. He was a two-term MLA during 1952 to 1962 as a member of the Indian National Congress.

References

Assam MLAs 1952–1957
Assam MLAs 1957–1962
Indian National Congress politicians from Assam
Year of birth missing
Year of death missing